The 1973 World Table Tennis Championships women's singles was the 32nd edition of the women's singles championship.
Hu Yu Lan defeated Alice Grófová in the final by three sets to nil, to win the title.

Results

See also
List of World Table Tennis Championships medalists

References

-
1973 in women's table tennis